Struge may refer to:

Struge, Bosnia and Herzegovina, a town in Čapljina municipality, Bosnia and Herzegovina
Struga, a town in the Republic of Macedonia
Pri Cerkvi–Struge, a village in the Municipality of Dobrepolje in Slovenia.